Dattani is a surname. Notable people with the surname include:

Mahesh Dattani (born 1958), Indian director, actor, playwright, and writer
Naomi Dattani (born 1994), English cricketer
Sameer Dattani (born 1982), Indian actor

Indian surnames